The 1977 All-Ireland Under-21 Football Championship was the 14th staging of the All-Ireland Under-21 Football Championship since its establishment by the Gaelic Athletic Association in 1964.

Kerry entered the championship as defending champions.

On 2 October 1977, Kerry won the championship following a 1-11 to 1-5 defeat of Down in the All-Ireland final. This was their fifth All-Ireland title overall and their third in successive championship seasons.

Results

All-Ireland Under-21 Football Championship

Semi-finals

Final

Statistics

Miscellaneous

 Leitrim win the Connacht title for the first time in their history.
 Kerry become the first team to win three successive All-Ireland titles.

References

1977
All-Ireland Under-21 Football Championship